Kéwa is a rural commune of the Cercle of Djenné in the Mopti Region of Mali. The principal village (chef-lieu) is Kouakourou.

References

Communes of Mopti Region